Yekusiel Yehuda III Teitelbaum, known by the Yiddish colloquial name Rav Zalman Leib (born 23 December 1951), is one of two Grand Rebbes of Satmar, and the son of Grand Rabbi Moshe Teitelbaum, the late Rebbe of the Satmar Hasidim. He is the son-in-law of the previous Bistritzer Rebbe of Brooklyn. He is currently one of the two Grand Rebbes of Satmar, with his faction being based in central Satmar congregation in Williamsburg, and the Dean of a Satmar yeshiva in Queens.

Prior to taking up his position in Williamsburg, Rabbi Teitelbaum was the rabbi of the Satmar Hasidim in Jerusalem. Before that, he was the rabbi of the Sighet synagogue in Boro Park, which had once been his father's synagogue. Presently, both of those synagogues are led by sons of Rabbi Zalman Teitelbaum. He is currently the Rabbi of the central Satmar synagogue in Williamsburg, at 152 Rodney Street. Additionally, he controls approximately ten smaller synagogues, as well as separate schools for boys and girls, in Williamsburg alone, and many more elsewhere which cater to over 10,000 students. He oversees several charitable funds and large organizations. The influential Yiddish newspaper Der Yid is published by his followers.

In 2007, Newsweek named him the 15th most influential rabbi in America.

Satmar succession feud

In May 1999, Moshe Teitelbaum appointed his second son, Zalman Teitelbaum, as the local leader of the Williamsburg congregation. This was seen as a signal from Moshe that Zalman was to become Chief Rabbi after his death.

Prior to May 1999, it was assumed that after the death of Moshe Teitelbaum, Satmar would be led by Aaron Teitelbaum, the eldest son. He was his father's representative in communal affairs, and assumed his father's responsibilities when his father traveled.

Moshe's appointment of Zalman as the local leader caused factions to form around Aaron and Zalman. Aaron supporters claimed that Moshe was "swayed by his advisers" to appoint Zalman because the advisers were concerned they would lose influence under Aaron's regime.

In April 2006, when Moshe died, each side declared their rabbi as the chief rabbi. At that time, Aaron supporters already controlled all assets in Kiryas Joel. Aaron supporters initiated legal proceedings to take control of the Williamsburg holdings from the Zalman supporters, including control of the sacred cemetery of the Brooklyn congregation. The court declined to render a decision, leaving the status quo. The non-decision was seen as a victory for the Zalman faction. Aaron's followers constructed, and began worshiping in, their own synagogue on Hooper Street.

Anti-Zionism
In keeping with the traditional beliefs of Satmar, Teitelbaum is a strong opponent of Zionism. He is closely affiliated with the Jerusalem-based anti-Zionist Eidah HaChareidis, particularly with Rabbi Yitzchok Tuvia Weiss. Teitelbaum has referred to the State of Israel as "this generation's Amalek", and said that "the Zionists came from the seed of Amalek. There has never been such a sect that caused so much damage to the Jewish people." He opposes the proposed draft of Haredi men by the Israel Defense Forces, and has encouraged resistance against the draft decree: "We must fight it uncompromisingly so that such ideas won't even cross their minds." Teitelbaum regularly raises money for impoverished anti-Zionist Jews in Israel, who refuse to accept government benefits.

See also
Hasidic Judaism
Joel Teitelbaum
Haredim and Zionism

External links
Ruling Leaves Younger Son in Control of Hasidic Sect
Tempers, bones snap in Hasidic infighting (26 October 2004)

References

Living people
1952 births
American Hasidic rabbis
Rebbes of Satmar
20th-century American rabbis
21st-century American rabbis
Orthodox rabbis from New York City
People from Borough Park, Brooklyn
Descendants of the Baal Shem Tov
People from Williamsburg, Brooklyn
Anti-Zionist Hasidic rabbis
Teitelbaum family